The Municipal District of Fairview No. 136 is a municipal district (MD) in northwestern Alberta, Canada. It is located in Census Division 19.

The district stretches along the northwestern leg of Highway 2.

Geography

Communities and localities 
 
The following urban municipalities are surrounded by the MD of Fairview No. 136.
Cities
none
Towns
Fairview
Villages
none
Summer villages
none

The following hamlets are located within the MD of Fairview No. 136.
Hamlets
Bluesky
Whitelaw

The following localities are located within the MD of Fairview No. 136.
Localities 
Dunvegan
Erin Lodge
Friedenstal
Gage
Highland Park
Lothrop
Red Star
Scotswood
Vanrena
Waterhole

Demographics 

In the 2016 Census of Population conducted by Statistics Canada, the MD of Fairview No. 136 had a population of 1,604 living in 620 of its 683 total private dwellings, a  change from its 2011 population of 1,673.

See also 
List of communities in Alberta
List of municipal districts in Alberta

References

External links 

 
Fairview